Nürnberg American High School (NAHS) was a Department of Defense Dependents Schools (DoDDS) system school located near Nürnberg, Germany.  One of DoDDS original five high schools in Germany, the school served the children of American military, government and civilian personnel from 1946 until its closing in 1995.

History 
In October 1946, only a year and a half after the Allied forces defeated the German Third Reich, American dependents of high school age in the Nürnberg area began school in a former private residence in Erlangen, a university town nearby.

The freshmen met in the dining room, the sophomores in the living room, and the juniors and seniors had classes upstairs in bedrooms, according to Ed Thompson, who was there as a freshman student. About 70 students were enrolled. After Thanksgiving, classes were moved into the Science Building at Erlangen University.

Though textbooks and supplies were hard come by, the faculty of eight and a teaching principal offered the core curriculum of the time. The students responded to their straitened circumstances by writing a constitution for their student council, organizing student assemblies, and holding a number of dances, including that staple of American high schools, the junior-senior prom. Beginning in January 1947, the students had a weekly mimeographed newspaper and ended the year by publishing a mimeographed yearbook. During the spring some students had an unusual educational opportunity in that they took field trips to sessions of the Nürnberg War Trials.
  
In June, all the seniors in the five high schools in Germany (about 100) were given a cruise down the Rhine, a tradition that was to continue for several years. Eight students graduated that first year in a combined ceremony with Munich American High School held at the Haus der Kunst in Munich.

In the fall of 1947, the school moved to 19 Tannenstrasse in Fürth, a town approximately 6.5 miles from the Nürnberg main railway station, and changed its name to Nürnberg American High School.

A former German girls school built in 1906, the building on Tannenstrasse offered facilities superior to those in Erlangen. It had a gymnasium, a large assembly room, and a large basement with a dining hall and a combination library and study hall. Nearby requisitioned three-story private homes served as dormitories.

Other facilities available to the students were a Teen-Age Club housed in the Fürth Opera House; Linde Stadium, an ice skating and swimming facility built by Nazi Germany for the 1936 Olympics; and Stein Castle, requisitioned from the Faber-Castell family.  It was the scene of the Junior-Senior Prom.

A German-American Youth Club encouraged interaction with the local populace. At one program in the Nürnberg Opera House, junior Don Hilty recited to a full house a speech given by Abraham Lincoln to a group of Germans in Ohio in 1861. Other programs included general knowledge quiz contests between the Americans and Germans and visits to each other's schools.
  
Enrollment remained low with approximately 70 students in grades 9-12. In June of its second year (1948) only four seniors graduated at the Haus der Kunst.

During the next three years while enrollment hovered around 100, interaction with the German populace continued to be a fairly important part of school life. The Nürnberg Opera House was the scene of a dance of 500 German and American youth and a forum discussing "World Federation." The Nürnberg Special Services, assisted by a number of NHS boys and girls, presented a musical production, “Rhapsody in Rhythm,” in a full opera house.

By the end of its fifth year, the Dependents School Service was able to claim that the courses of study, textbooks, and teaching supplies in the American schools in Germany compared favorably with the best in the United States. 
Though the U.S. Army was still the army of occupation and MPs guarded the school doors and often rode buses and trains when American youth traveled to and from school, American young people moved about freely and without fear, so reports one NHS alumnus who was there in the 1950–51 school year 

1952 was a transforming year for the Americans in Germany. With the signing of the Deutschlandvertrag  the occupation ended, and Germany and the U.S. became allies. For the students at NHS the change in status meant a new school building. The requisitioned building at 19 Tannenstrasse was returned to the Germans, and the U.S. built a brand new school at 30 Fronmüllerstraße, complete with an adjacent dormitory. It opened January 3, 1952.

At the same time, American dependents began to leave their housing “on the economy” and move into newly built housing around schools or U.S. bases.  By 1955 the Kalb Community had grown up around NHS, and the campus boasted five additional buildings, including a new gymnasium. After this year, interaction with the native populace became a minor part of school life and remained so throughout the rest of the time NHS was open.

Throughout the first decade of its existence, NHS enrollment averaged 120 and an average of 19 seniors graduated. In 1956-57 enrollment went over 200 for the first time (207) and there were 27 graduates  A year later the enrollment had jumped another 100 students to 312.

In June 1995, the last graduating seniors were awarded their diplomas from Nürnberg American High School, and the school closed 49 years after its opening. The Cold War was over; American troops were being withdrawn from the Nürnberg area.

Military Communities Served 
 In 1946–47, the military communities served were Amberg, Ansbach, Bad Kissingen, Bamberg, Bayreuth, Giebelstadt, Grafenwohr, Kitzingen, Nürnberg, Regensburg, Schweinfurt, Straubing, Weiden, and Würzburg. The communities served varied from year to year as military bases and schools opened and closed. In 1957-58 these were the communities served:  Amberg, Ansbach, Bamberg, Bayreuth. Crailsheim, Erlangen, Fürth, Grafenwohr, Herzo, Hohenfels, Illesheim, Nürnberg, Rothenberg, Schwabach, Schwäbisch Hall, Vilseck.

Dorm Life 
Any student who lived more than 50 miles from the school lived in nearby residence facilities during the school week and went home for the weekend.

Facilities for resident students were primitive that first year. According to freshman Ed Thompson, the boys lived in an old barracks at the Erlangen Air Force base, sleeping on GI cots. They had hot water but no other heat. During this time, senior Sherrill Fetzer became “renowned for starting a fire in a metal waste can in an effort to keep warm.” The boys were later moved into a private residence.

The girls lived in a private residence. Junior Peggy Segur Misch remembered the bitter cold of that first year. "Getting hot water for bathing was a problem. A gas heater had to be turned on to heat the bath water. Because there was danger of asphyxiation from the heater, the window in the bathroom had to be wide open while the water was being heated – so it was hot water but cold air." She said the girls bathed only twice a week.

Meals were also problematic. At first the resident students had their meals in the U.S. Army mess hall at Erlangen. Ed Thompson said, “The girls sure did get the once-over by all the GIs ....” Music for dining was often provided. At his first meal there, Thompson said a German girl sang “Sentimental Journey.”   Later, meals were eaten in a German hotel, the Kaiserhof, whose food freshman Bub Kale described  as “mostly just to look at – it looks good but doesn't always taste that way.” 

Conditions were much improved with the move to Fürth in 1947. The dormitory students lived about three blocks from the school in two large three-story private homes, two to four persons to a room depending on the size of the room. They had a common social room and meals were served in the basement of the school building.

Both dormitories had supervisors, adults hired to keep order. Freshman Sara Davis Rodgers remembered her dorm supervisor vividly, Miss Margaret Mason, an English lady. She was known for insisting on open windows no matter the weather and a rigid bath schedule with each bather allotted “a certain time, in a certain amount of water, and for a specified time.”  The morning get up call was especially memorable. The National Anthem was played over loudspeakers at full volume. “If your feet hadn't hit the floor and you weren't in an upright position immediately, Miss Mason was in your room berating you: 'Stand up you unpatriotic daughter of a rich American Army officer.' The loudspeakers then played 'I'm Looking over a Four Leaf Clover.'” 

Later, the dorm was located on the school campus and was co-ed. Boys were housed on one side of the building, while girls were on the opposite side.  The areas were separated by a large room with couches, stereo speakers, pool and foosball tables.

Notable alumni
 Warren M. Robbins, teacher 1950–51, deceased, founder and director emeritus Smithsonian National Museum of African Art, director of Center for Cross-Cultural Communication.
 James Clapper, student, Class of 1959, retired Lt. General in U.S. Air Force and former U.S. Director of National Intelligence.
 Herbert J. Barker, student, Class of 1961, Retired US Navy Commander, Collegiate Associate Professor University of Maryland, University College, Episcopal Missionary to Republic of Taiwan.
 Dianne Wiest, student, Class of 1965, actress on stage, television and film. She won two Academy Awards, two Emmy Awards and a Golden Globe Award.
 Jay Beckenstein, student, Class of 1969, saxophone player, smooth jazz artist and together with Jeremy Wall founded Spyro Gyra.
Elba Serrano, Professor of Neuroscience at New Mexico State University and winner of the Presidential Award for Excellence in Science, Mathematics, and Engineering Mentoring.
  Stuart Diamond, student, Class of 1966; Pulitzer Prize, The New York Times; Professor, Wharton Business School (U Penn); author Getting More, NY Times bestseller, best negotiation book "of all time" (Inc.com), one of 25 books on leadership/success to read in one's life (Amazon, Business Insider).

Fallen Eagles 
The following alumni were killed in the course of military service.

Class of 1959
 CPT (USA) Vesa Juhani Alakulppi     d: May 14, 1968   Vietnam

Class of 1960
 LTJG (USN) Donavan Lee Ewoldt  d: July 29, 1966   Vietnam

Class of 1962
 2LT (USA) Jeffrey Ross Sexton  d: July 22, 1967   Vietnam

Class of 1965
 SP4 (USA) Daniel "Smokey" Mason  d: April 22, 1968  Vietnam
 1LT (USA) Sylvain Larry White  d: May 27, 1968  Vietnam

References

External links 

 American Overseas Schools Historical Society
 Nurnberg Alumni Association

American international schools in Germany
International schools in Bavaria
Schools in Nuremberg
Department of Defense Education Activity
Educational institutions established in 1946
1946 establishments in Germany
Educational institutions disestablished in 1995
1995 disestablishments in Germany
Defunct schools in Germany